Ampahana is a town and commune in northern Madagascar. It belongs to the district of Antalaha, which is a part of Sava Region. According to 2001 commune census the population of Ampahana was 25,000.

Only primary schooling is available in town. The majority 85% of the population are farmers, while an additional 2% receives their livelihood from raising livestock. The most important crop is vanilla, while other important products are pineapple, coffee and rice.  Industry and services provide employment for 3% and 5% of the population, respectively. Additionally fishing employs 5% of the population.

References and notes 

Populated places in Sava Region